Iswepe, officially Insephe, is a village and railway siding in Gert Sibande District Municipality in the Mpumalanga province of South Africa.

References

Populated places in the Mkhondo Local Municipality